The 1957–58 Mexican Segunda División was the eighth season of the Mexican Segunda División. The season started on 24 July 1957 and concluded on 1 December 1957. It was won by Celaya.

Changes 
 Zamora and Morelia were promoted to Primera División.
 Monterrey was relegated from Primera División.
 Montecarlo de Irapuato have dissolved.
 IPN and UNAM went into hiatus and did not play the season.
 Municipal de Irapuato, Salamanca and San Luis joined the league.
 Marte was disqualified the previous season and was suspended to play this football cycle.

Teams

League table

Results

References 

1957–58 in Mexican football
Segunda División de México seasons